Bigg Boss 10, also known as Bigg Boss: India Isse Apna Hi Ghar Samjho is the tenth season of the Indian reality TV series Bigg Boss. It began airing on 16 October 2016 on Colors TV.
It was the first time when the doors of house were opened for commoners called Indiawale. This season ended on 29 January 2017 with Manveer Gurjar as the winner. Bani J became the first runner up.

This was the first season of Bigg Boss to be aired on an OTT platform - Voot. New element called ‘Unseen-Undekha’ was introduced by way of unseen footage uploaded on Voot.

Housemates status

Housemates
The participants in the order of appearance and entered in house are:

Commoners and Celebrities
 Swami Om – Social, religious and political leader. He was 60 years old and was from Delhi, India.
 Lopamudra Raut – Model and beauty queen. She is an engineer by profession. She represented India at Miss United Continents 2016 pageant and was crowned 2nd runner up. She also won the "Best National Costume" award for India three years in a row.
 Manveer Gurjar – Farmer. He is from Aghapur in Noida.
 Nitibha Kaul – Google marketing worker. She is from Kashmir. She is 23 years old and a former account strategist for Google Marketing Solutions.
 Lokesh Sharma – Student from Delhi.
 Akanksha Sharma – She is a Haryanvi writer and stage actress. She is the ex-wife of Yuvraj Singh's brother, Zorawar Singh.
 Rohan Mehra – Television actor. He played Karan mehra's onscreen son, Naksh in the Star Plus show Yeh Rishta Kya Kehlata Hai. He has also appeared in other shows like Bade Achhe Lagte Hain and Gumrah: End of Innocence. He has worked as a commercial model and in the films Uvaa and Sixteen (16).
 Gurbani Judge – Reality TV actress, model and VJ. She participated in the reality show MTV Roadies in 2006. She later acted in films Aap Kaa Surroor and Zorawar. She has participated in the reality shows Fear Factor: Khatron Ke Khiladi and Box Cricket League.
 Karan Mehra – Television actor. He is known for his role of Naitik in the popular show Yeh Rishta Kya Kehlata Hai  which aired on Star Plus. He participated in the dance reality show Nach Baliye along with wife Nisha Rawal in 2012.
 Manu Punjabi – Reality TV actor. He participated in Life OK's The Bachelorette India: Mere Khayaalon Ki Mallika in 2013.
 Gaurav Chopra – Actor. He is known for his roles in television shows like Uttaran and Doli Armaano Ki. He participated in Nach Baliye and Pati Patni Aur Woh along with Narayani Shastri and Mouni Roy.
 Priyanka Jagga – Marketing recruiter.
 Rahul Dev – Film actor. He is known for his roles in Bollywood. He has acted in many films like Kyon Ki, Ek Paheli Leela and Dishoom. He participated reality shows Power Couple with Mugdha Godse and Fear Factor: Khatron Ke Khiladi.
 Navin Prakash – Teacher.
 Antara Biswas (also known as Monalisa) – Bhojpuri actress. She is a Bengali actress who has appeared in more than 100 Bhojpuri films. She has appeared in films like Blackmail and Bunty Aur Babli.

Wild Card entrants
 Jason Shah – Fitness model. He has acted in the films Partner and Fitoor.
 Elena Kazan – Film actress. She is German-Russian actress who appears in German as well as Indian films such as Agent Vinod, John Day and Prague.
 Sahil Anand – Actor. He is known for participating in MTV Roadies in 2006. He later acted in the films Student of the Year and Love Day - Pyaar Ka Din. He also acted in television shows like Mera Naam Karegi Roshan, Rang Badalti Odhani, Sasural Simar Ka and Ek Nayi Ummeed - Roshni.

Guests appearances

Weekly summary 
The main events in the house are summarised in the table below. A typical week begins with nominations, followed by the luxury budget task, punishment than a task for immunity or anything else and then the eviction of a housemate during the Sunday or Saturday episode called as "Weekend Ka Vaar". Evictions, tasks, and other notable events for a particular week are noted in order of sequence.

Nominations table

Color Key
  indicates that the Housemate was directly nominated for eviction.
  indicates that the Housemate was immune prior to nominations.
  indicates the winner.
  indicates the first runner up.
  indicates the second runner up.
  indicates the third runner up.
  indicates the contestant has been evicted.
  indicates the contestant walked out due to emergency.
  indicates the contestant has been ejected.
  house captain.
  indicates the contestant is nominated.

 Swami Om was evicted by the regular eviction process however in accordance with the secret room twist he was moved to a temporary abode and later returned in the week that followed.
Priyanka was evicted in the double eviction on Day 57. However, she was moved to the secret room and later returned to the house.
 Priyanka was asked to leave the house by host of the show Salman Khan after a heated exchange with him during which he threatened to quit presenting the show from there on and for future seasons if Priyanka did not exit the house. Priyanka Left the house under the circumstances. It is unknown whether her decision was influenced by the producers but is strongly alleged. The nominations were carry forwarded because she was ejected.
 Swami Om was ejected from the house after he threw his urine which he had stored in a container on Bani and Rohan during the captaincy task.
 Manveer was made house captain for three weeks following a task he won for eternal immunity.
 Following an offer presented to all housemates by Bigg Boss, Manu chose to take the  lakh and left the house.

Nomination notes

References

External links
 Official Website

2016 Indian television seasons
2017 Indian television seasons
10